Ittihad Al-Zarqa is a Jordanian football club based in the city of Zarqa, that competes in the Jordan Premier League.

Stadium
Currently, the team plays at the 17,000 capacity Prince Mohammed Stadium.

References

External links
Futbol24
Soccerway
Football clubs in Jordan
Zarqa